David N. Feldman (born 1960) is an American attorney specializing in small company finance, is author of Reverse Mergers: Taking a Company Public Without an IPO, published by Bloomberg Press in September 2006, Reverse Mergers and Other Alternatives to Traditional IPOs Second Edition (Bloomberg Press 2009), and  coauthor of PIPES: A Guide to Private Investments in Public Equity, Revised and Updated Edition (Bloomberg Press, 2005).

Biography
Feldman was born in 1960 in Long Island, New York. After attending Lawrence Woodmere Academy, he enrolled at the Wharton School of the University of Pennsylvania where he was the program director of WQHS Radio, Penn's radio station. He received a Bachelor of Science in Economics from Penn in 1982. He then went to the University of Pennsylvania Law School, graduating in 1985. While in law school, he served as the editor in chief of the newspaper. He also embarked on a joint venture with Howard Griboff to purchase a radio station in Daytona Beach, Florida. Feldman was the chairman of the station while Griboff ran the station, but the station ultimately was sold at a loss.

Career
After law school, he worked as an associate attorney at Rivkin Radler LLP in Uniondale, NY from 1985 to 1986, and at Fulbright & Jaworski in Manhattan (formerly Reavis & McGrath) until 1988. Subsequently, he worked at Pryor Cashman LLP from 1988 to 1992, before starting a firm with a partner: Feldman and Ellenoff. He left Feldman and Ellenoff in 1996 to start his own firm, which became Feldman LLP. As of 2010, Feldman has been a partner at Richardson & Patel LLP.

His practice focuses on corporate and securities matters and general representation of public and private companies, investment banks, private equity firms and high-net-worth individuals.

He is particularly interested in issues related to formation, management and acquisition of public shell companies and implementation of reverse mergers, in which a private company becomes publicly traded through a merger with a publicly held "shell" company.   He has appeared on Bloomberg TV and National Public Radio and been quoted in The New York Times, The Wall Street Journal, Financial Times USA Today, Market News First, Forbes, Entrepreneur, CFO Magazine and others. In June 2005 he testified before the U.S. Securities and Exchange Commission's Advisory Committee on Smaller Public Companies. Feldman's blog, visited by thousands of professionals each month, offers insights on reverse mergers, SPACs, other alternatives to traditional initial public offerings, the small and microcap markets and the economy. He is also a regular contributor on entrepreneurship to Slate.com's small business site.

Additional affiliations 
He is the former Chair of the Wharton School's   alumni association, and is also the founder of the New York Business School Clubs, an association of New York-area business school alumni groups. He  also serves as a member of the Board of Advisors of Channel Capital Management LLC,  the Board of Trustees of Lawrence Woodmere Academy, and   the Board of Directors of Youth Renewal Fund.

References

External links
 David N. Feldman's LinkedIn profile  

New York (state) lawyers
University of Pennsylvania Law School alumni
People from Long Island
Wharton School of the University of Pennsylvania alumni
1960 births
Living people
Lawrence Woodmere Academy alumni